Paraskevopoulos ("son of Paraskevas") is a Greek surname with the feminine form being Paraskevopoulou (Παρασκευοπούλου). It is the surname of:

 Georgios Paraskevopoulos, Greek cyclist
 Ioannis Paraskevopoulos (1900–1984), Greek banker and interim Prime Minister of Greece
 John S. Paraskevopoulos (1889–1961), Greek–South African astronomer
 Leonidas Paraskevopoulos (1860–1936), Greek general and politician
 Nikos Paraskevopoulos, Greek criminologist and Minister of Justice.
 Panagiotis Paraskevopoulos (1875–1956), Greek athlete
 Zoi Paraskevopoulou, Greek archer

See also
 5298 Paraskevopoulos asteroid, named after John S. Paraskevopoulos.
 Paraskevopoulos (crater) on the far side of the Moon, named after John S. Paraskevopoulos.

Greek-language surnames
Surnames